Mountain View College may refer to:

 Mountain View College (Philippines)
 Mountain View College (Texas)